Meelon is a small townsite in the Peel region of Western Australia, located between Pinjarra and Dwellingup within the Shire of Murray. At the 2011 census, Meelon had a population of 224.

It was originally established as a saw-milling site by the local timber industry in the 1900s and was serviced by a siding on the Pinjarra-Narrogin railway. Following the decline of the industry in the 1950s, Meelon all but disappeared, and today primarily consists of medium-acreage farms which are dependent on Pinjarra for services. The Hotham Valley Railway, a tourist railway, passes through but does not stop in Meelon.

References

Towns in Western Australia
Shire of Murray